General elections were held in the Isle of Man on 23 September 2021. A record ten women were elected, twice as many as the five elected at the previous election. For the first time, in two constituencies, both elected MHKs were women. Four government ministers failed to be re-elected.

Electoral system
The 24 members of the House of Keys are elected from 12 constituencies, each of which returns 2 members. Election is by multiple non-transferable vote in each constituency, with voters having two votes (although voters are not required to use both) for the two seats.

The Chief Minister is appointed after a general election on nomination by the House of Keys.

Candidates
A total of 65 candidates ran. The incumbent Chief Minister, Howard Quayle (MHK for Middle) did not stand for re-election.

Results
Over 85% of candidates ran without party affiliation, and the largest elected party contingent, the Manx Labour Party, consisted of two MHKs. The Manx Labour Party ran three candidates, Liberal Vannin ran four, and the Isle of Man Green Party ran two. The 2021 election was the first election in which the Green Party fielded candidates, having previously only stood in local elections.

By constituency
Sources:

{| class="wikitable" style="margin-right:1em; font-size:95%;"
|+ style="background-color:#f2f2f2; margin-bottom:-1px; border:1px solid #aaa; padding:0.2em 0.4em;" | Arbory, Castletown & Malew 
! scope="col" rowspan="2" colspan="2" style="width:15em;" | Party
! scope="col" rowspan="2" style="width:17em;" | Candidate
! scope="col" colspan="2"                     | Votes
|-
! scope="col"             style="width:4em;"  | Count
! scope="col"             style="width:6em;"  | Of total (%)

{| class="wikitable" style="margin-right:1em; font-size:95%;"
|+ style="background-color:#f2f2f2; margin-bottom:-1px; border:1px solid #aaa; padding:0.2em 0.4em;" | Ayre & Michael 
! scope="col" rowspan="2" colspan="2" style="width:15em;" | Party
! scope="col" rowspan="2" style="width:17em;" | Candidate
! scope="col" colspan="2"                     | Votes
|-
! scope="col"             style="width:4em;"  | Count
! scope="col"             style="width:6em;"  | Of total (%)

{| class="wikitable" style="margin-right:1em; font-size:95%;"
|+ style="background-color:#f2f2f2; margin-bottom:-1px; border:1px solid #aaa; padding:0.2em 0.4em;" | Douglas Central 
! scope="col" rowspan="2" colspan="2" style="width:15em;" | Party
! scope="col" rowspan="2" style="width:17em;" | Candidate
! scope="col" colspan="2"                     | Votes
|-
! scope="col"             style="width:4em;"  | Count
! scope="col"             style="width:6em;"  | Of total (%)

{| class="wikitable" style="margin-right:1em; font-size:95%;"
|+ style="background-color:#f2f2f2; margin-bottom:-1px; border:1px solid #aaa; padding:0.2em 0.4em;" | Douglas East 
! scope="col" rowspan="2" colspan="2" style="width:15em;" | Party
! scope="col" rowspan="2" style="width:17em;" | Candidate
! scope="col" colspan="2"                     | Votes
|-
! scope="col"             style="width:4em;"  | Count
! scope="col"             style="width:6em;"  | Of total (%)

{| class="wikitable" style="margin-right:1em; font-size:95%;"
|+ style="background-color:#f2f2f2; margin-bottom:-1px; border:1px solid #aaa; padding:0.2em 0.4em;" | Douglas North 
! scope="col" rowspan="2" colspan="2" style="width:15em;" | Party
! scope="col" rowspan="2" style="width:17em;" | Candidate
! scope="col" colspan="2"                     | Votes
|-
! scope="col"             style="width:4em;"  | Count
! scope="col"             style="width:6em;"  | Of total (%)

{| class="wikitable" style="margin-right:1em; font-size:95%;"
|+ style="background-color:#f2f2f2; margin-bottom:-1px; border:1px solid #aaa; padding:0.2em 0.4em;" | Douglas South 
! scope="col" rowspan="2" colspan="2" style="width:15em;" | Party
! scope="col" rowspan="2" style="width:17em;" | Candidate
! scope="col" colspan="2"                     | Votes
|-
! scope="col"             style="width:4em;"  | Count
! scope="col"             style="width:6em;"  | Of total (%)

{| class="wikitable" style="margin-right:1em; font-size:95%;"
|+ style="background-color:#f2f2f2; margin-bottom:-1px; border:1px solid #aaa; padding:0.2em 0.4em;" | Garff 
! scope="col" rowspan="2" colspan="2" style="width:15em;" | Party
! scope="col" rowspan="2" style="width:17em;" | Candidate
! scope="col" colspan="2"                     | Votes
|-
! scope="col"             style="width:4em;"  | Count
! scope="col"             style="width:6em;"  | Of total (%)

{| class="wikitable" style="margin-right:1em; font-size:95%;"
|+ style="background-color:#f2f2f2; margin-bottom:-1px; border:1px solid #aaa; padding:0.2em 0.4em;" | Glenfaba & Peel 
! scope="col" rowspan="2" colspan="2" style="width:15em;" | Party
! scope="col" rowspan="2" style="width:17em;" | Candidate
! scope="col" colspan="2"                     | Votes
|-
! scope="col"             style="width:4em;"  | Count
! scope="col"             style="width:6em;"  | Of total (%)

{| class="wikitable" style="margin-right:1em; font-size:95%;"
|+ style="background-color:#f2f2f2; margin-bottom:-1px; border:1px solid #aaa; padding:0.2em 0.4em;" | Middle 
! scope="col" rowspan="2" colspan="2" style="width:15em;" | Party
! scope="col" rowspan="2" style="width:17em;" | Candidate
! scope="col" colspan="2"                     | Votes
|-
! scope="col"             style="width:4em;"  | Count
! scope="col"             style="width:6em;"  | Of total (%)

{| class="wikitable" style="margin-right:1em; font-size:95%;"
|+ style="background-color:#f2f2f2; margin-bottom:-1px; border:1px solid #aaa; padding:0.2em 0.4em;" | Onchan 
! scope="col" rowspan="2" colspan="2" style="width:15em;" | Party
! scope="col" rowspan="2" style="width:17em;" | Candidate
! scope="col" colspan="2"                     | Votes
|-
! scope="col"             style="width:4em;"  | Count
! scope="col"             style="width:6em;"  | Of total (%)

{| class="wikitable" style="margin-right:1em; font-size:95%;"
|+ style="background-color:#f2f2f2; margin-bottom:-1px; border:1px solid #aaa; padding:0.2em 0.4em;" | Ramsey 
! scope="col" rowspan="2" colspan="2" style="width:15em;" | Party
! scope="col" rowspan="2" style="width:17em;" | Candidate
! scope="col" colspan="2"                     | Votes
|-
! scope="col"             style="width:4em;"  | Count
! scope="col"             style="width:6em;"  | Of total (%)

{| class="wikitable" style="margin-right:1em; font-size:95%;"
|+ style="background-color:#f2f2f2; margin-bottom:-1px; border:1px solid #aaa; padding:0.2em 0.4em;" | Rushen 
! scope="col" rowspan="2" colspan="2" style="width:15em;" | Party
! scope="col" rowspan="2" style="width:17em;" | Candidate
! scope="col" colspan="2"                     | Votes
|-
! scope="col"             style="width:4em;"  | Count
! scope="col"             style="width:6em;"  | Of total (%)

See also
List of political parties on the Isle of Man
Politics of the Isle of Man

References

General
Elections in the Isle of Man
Isle of Man